Morshi  is the second largest town in the Amravati district of Maharashtra, India. It is located 55 km north-east of Amravati, situated very close to the border with Madhya Pradesh, in the scenic southern foothills of the Satpura ranges. Morshi and the surrounding region is also known for the cultivation of Nagpur oranges and the prominent Nal Damayanti Dam.

Administration 
Morshi is an important sub-district (Tehsil) in Amravati district. Morshi town is a sub-district headquarters. Sub-district administration is run by a sub-divisional officer from IAS. The revenue administration is run by Tehsildar. Other important government establishment in Morshi are the civil and criminal courts and police station.

Local administration is run by a Morshi Nagar Parishad, a city council.

Demographics
As per the 2011 Indian census, Morshi had a population of 37,333, of which 19031 were males and 18302 were females. 8,996 were children ages 0-6, which was 10.19% of the total population.

In Morshi, the female sex ratio is 966 against the state average of 929. Moreover, child sex ratio is around  1000 compared to the Maharashtra state average of 894.
Out of the total population of Morshi, Schedule Cast (SC) constitutes 9.67% while Schedule Tribe (ST) were 5.24%.
The literacy rate of Morshi city is 90.60%, higher than the state average of 82.34%. Male literacy is around 93.46% while female literacy rate is 87.61%.

Morshi municipal council has total administration over 8,268 houses to which it supplies basic amenities like water and sewage. It is also authorised to build roads within municipal council limits and impose taxes on properties coming under its jurisdiction.

Transportation

Railway
Narkhed and Amravati towns in Maharashtra's orange belt have waited for more than 80 years to be linked by rail. The 140-km track was first sanctioned in 1928 under the British, but stayed on the backburner. The project was revived only in 1993–94 and a budget of Rs 2.84 billion approved.

Afterwards, Prime Minister P.V. Narasimha Rao laid the foundation stone; however, political activities stalled the project for many more years.

In September 2008, when President Pratibha Patil inaugurated the New Amravati railway station, it seemed as if the project would be completed soon. Nevertheless, this appears to be far from reality, and it was not until November 2009 when the Railway Ministry announced the link would be inaugurated in December 2010.

Narkhed-Amravati line is ready in January 2014. Railways are now available to travel from Narkhed to Bhusaval. Morshi's railway station has given the name Morshi railway station. The railway station is 2 km from the centre of the Morshi city.

The Amravati - Chandur Bazar - Morshi - Warud - Narkher railway track is electrified. People of Morshi can travel by train to cities such as Amravati, Akola, Shegaon, Bhusawal, Hingoli, Nanded, Hyderabad, Narkher, Warud, Chandur Bazar, Badnera, Indore, Jaipur, Bhopal, Banglore.

Roadways
There is a Morshi MSRTC Depot of Maharashtra State Transport (S.T. Bus) in Morshi city. It has better connectivity with neighbouring towns and districts Amaravati, Akola, Nagpur, Yavatmal, Buldhana, Wardha and Pune, Aurangabad. Buses for neighbouring state Madhya Pradesh, in Districts like Betul, Chhindwara, Burhanpur, Bhopal are also available.

Places of attraction
 Upper Wardha Dam constructed on the River Wardha.
 Nisarg Paryatan Kendra, Morshi.
 Salbardi: Shiva {chota mahadev} temple located in Satpura mountains about 8.50 kilometer away from Morshi bus station.
 Pinglai Devi Temple: Pinglai Devi Temple located Near Ner Pinglai Village of Tahsil 
 Bhorkup: Amba devi temple located in Satpura mountains (Dharul)
Ridhapur: Mahanubhav Panth God. Also named Mahanubhav Panth Kashi
 Kalankeshvar : Mahanubhav Panth God.Placed at Nerpingalai Village

References

http://www.thehindu.com/todays-paper/tp-in-school/12000yrold-rock-paintings-discovered-near-betul/article4383983.ece

Amravati district
Talukas in Maharashtra